Bythinella bavarica is a species of species of very small freshwater snail, an aquatic gastropod mollusk in the family Amnicolidae. This species is endemic to Germany.

References

Bythinella
Endemic fauna of Germany
Gastropods described in 1877
Taxonomy articles created by Polbot